Gyrodon crassipes is a bolete mushroom described in 1983 from Ethiopia. it has a cinnamon-coloured cap that turns black-brown to touch, decurrent gills and a brown stem.

References

External links
 

Fungi described in 1983
Paxillaceae
Fungi of Africa